Futbol Club Sonsonate is a Salvadoran professional football club based in Sonsonate, El Salvador.

The club plays its home games at Estadio Anna Mercedes Campos, a stadium located in the City suburb of Sonsonate, Sonsonate, since 2009. The team is currently led by head coach Uruguayan Rubén da Silva.

History

On 9 September 2009, César Antonio Contreras and Miguel Antonio Castillo along with Pedro Antonio Contreras and with the support of the Sonsonate department (in particular the head of the department José Roberto Aquino) were able to re-activate Sonsonate from defunct status and begin their time in the modern era.

The club competed in the Tercera División for a few years, before winning promotion to the Segunda División in 2011, under the direction of Ricardo Andrés Navarro.

Despite strong club following and several finals appearances the club failed to win either the Segunda Division Apertura or Clausura title to achieve promotion in the Primera Division.

However, on the 12 July 2015, the club purchased the spot of recently promoted Real Destroyer meaning the club will participate in the Primera division for the first time in fifteen years (last time was 1999).

Despite several Championship winning managers coaching Sonsonate, Peruvian Agustin Castillo, Uruguayan Rubén da Silva and Salvadoran Juan Ramon Sanchez have been the only coaches to qualify Sonsonate to the post season final series, the club reached the semi-finals under Agustin Castillo and Ruben Da Silva, and Quarter final under Juan Ramon Sanchez, before each time being eliminated by Alianza F.C.

Sponsorship
Companies that Sonsonate currently has sponsorship deals with include:
 Milan – Official Kit Suppliers
 Proaces – Official sponsors
 Credimarco  – Official sponsors
 Alcasa  – Official sponsors
 Alcadia de Sonsonate – 
 Fenix Inversiones e Inmobiliario
 Caja de credito Sonsonate
 Salud
 Ferreteria Santa Sofia

Stadium
 Estadio Anna Mercedes Campos; Sonsonate (2009–)
 Estadio Municipal de Izalco; Izalco
 Estadio Cepa; Acajutla (2008)
 Estadio Julio Milian Morales; Juayúa (2015)

The team plays its home games in Estadio Anna Mercedes Campos, in Sonsonate, which opened in and has a seating capacity of 8,000. Previously the team played at Estadio Cepa for the 2009 season when they were called Alba-Acajutla which is located in Acajutla. They also previously played at the Estadio Municipal de Izalco in Izalco, which has a capacity of 8,000.

For the 2015 season, Sonsonate played their home matches (due to renovations being done Estadio Anna Mercedes Campos) at the Estadio José Millán Morales which is located in Juayúa.

Colors and nicknames

Kits, colours and designs

Official Kits 
 Official Sponsor: Rush Athletic 
 Holder Uniform : Green T-shirt, blue-black shorts, black stockings.
 Visiting Uniform: White shirt with light green stripes and white pants with green vivid, white socks with green vivid. 
 Alternative uniform: Traditional green shirt with white stripe on the chest and green shorts, green socks.

Sonsonate wore the green and white striped jersey since their establishment.

Various name changes have brought about different colored jerseys.
In 2008, after the club relocated from Sonsonate to Acatulja, the club changed their colours to rad and white.

However, after the club moved back to Sonsonate they reverted to green and white.

Nicknames
 Los Tiburones (the Sharks) Known during as Alba Acajutla
 Los Cocoteros (The Coconuts)

Honours

Domestic honours

Leagues
 Tercera División Salvadorean
 Winners: 2011

Club records
For records of Sonsonate pre 2009 are located records of Sonsonate FC.

 First victory in the Primera Division for Sonsonate: 1–0 Santa Tecla 28 January 2016
 First goalscorer in the Primera Division for Sonsonate: Augusto do Carmo v Dragon 1 November 2015
 Largest Home victory, Primera División: 3–0 v Pasaquina, 23 April 2018
 Largest Away victory, Primera División: 3–0 v FAS, 27 November 2016
 Largest Home loss, Primera División: 0–4 v Alianza, 12 December 2016
 Largest Away loss, Primera División: 0–4 v FAS, 3 April 2016  0–4 v UES, 27 April 2016
 Highest home attendance: 8,000 v Primera División, Estadio Anna Mercedes Campos, Sonsonate, Day Month Year
 Highest away attendance: 12,621 v Primera División, TBD, San Salvador, Day Month Year
 Highest average attendance, season: 49,176, Primera División
 Most appearances, Primera División: 602, TBD 1972–1991
 Most goals scored, Primera División: 35, Primera División Apertura 2016
 Most goals scored, season, Primera División: 35, Primera División Apertura 2016

Individual records
 Record appearances (all competitions): TBD, 822 from 1957 to 1975
 Record appearances (Primera Division):  Salvadoran Edson Melendez, 125 from 2016
 Most capped player for El Salvador: 63 (0 whilst at Sonsonate), Juan Jose Gomez
 Most international caps for El Salvador while an Sonsonate player: 2, Henry Hernandez
 Most caps won whilst at Sonsonate: 2, Henry Hernandez.
 Record scorer in league: Panamanian Armando Polo, 28
 Most goals in a season (all competitions): TBD, 62 (1927/28) (47 in League, 15 in Cup competitions)
 Most goals in a season (Primera Division): Panamanian Armando Polo, 13

Most appearances 

Bolded players are currently on the Sonsonate roster.

Goals

Bolded players are currently on the Sonsonate roster.

Most shutouts 

Bolded players are currently on the Sonsonate roster.

Current squad
As of 2021:

In

Out

Out on loan

Players with dual citizenship
    Sebastien Rondeau

Current Technical Staff

Coaching staff

Current Owners C.D. Sonsonate

Management

Affiliate Team

Reserve squad
As of 2018:

List of Sonsonate coaches (2009–)
Sonsonate have had 25 different managers since the return era in 2009. Uruguayan Rubén da Silva served the longest term, being in office for one year and 10 months. Hector Jara , Cesar Acevedo, Wilson Sánchez, and Ruben Alonso served two terms each, while Mario Elias Guevara served three.

For coaches of Sonsonate pre 2009 are located List of Sonsonate FC coaches.

Notable players

Team captains

Notes

References

 
Sonsonate
Sonsonate
Sonsonate
Sonsonate Department